Tomáš Berdych was the defending champion, but chose to compete in the 2012 Rakuten Japan Open Tennis Championships instead. Novak Djokovic beat Jo-Wilfried Tsonga 7–6(7–4), 6–2 in the final to win a third China Open title and improve to a 14–0 record.

Seeds

Draw

Finals

Top half

Bottom half

Qualifying

Seeds

Qualifiers

Draw

First qualifier

Second qualifier

Third qualifier

Fourth qualifier

References
 Main Draw
 Qualifying Draw

China Open - Men's Singles